The 1990 McDonald's All-American Boys Game was an All-star basketball game played on Sunday, April 15, 1990 at the Market Square Arena in Indianapolis. The game's rosters featured the best and most highly recruited high school boys graduating in 1990. The game was the 13th annual version of the McDonald's All-American Game first played in 1978.

1990 game
The game was telecast live for the last time by ABC. In 1991 CBS became the telecaster. The rosters were characterized by promising centers, especially three taller than 7 ft: Eric Montross, Luther Wright and Shawn Bradley;  Bradley, with his 7-6 frame, was the tallest player to ever appear in the McDonald's game up to that point. Other highly regarded prospects were forwards Grant Hill and Ed O'Bannon and guards Khalid Reeves and Derrick Phelps (who were teammates at Christ the King). Bradley and Reeves were named co-MVPs: Bradley had 12 points, 10 rebounds and 6 blocks, confirming his ability as a shot-blocker; Reeves scored 22 points and recorded 10 steals, the highest of the history of McDonald's All-American Games (a record which still stands as of 2018). Other players who starred were Adrian Autry (8 points and 11 assists), Eric Montross, Clifford Rozier, Anthony Cade, Grant Hill and Ed O'Bannon. Of the 20 players, 13 went on to play at least 1 game in the NBA.

East roster

West roster

Coaches
The East team was coached by:
 Head Coach Vito Montelli of St. Joseph High School (Trumbull, Connecticut)
 Asst Coach James Olayos of St. Joseph High School (Trumbull, Connecticut)

The West team was coached by:
 Head Coach Norm Held of Anderson High School (Anderson, Indiana)
 Asst Coach Dick Maynard of Anderson High School (Anderson, Indiana)
 Asst Coach Troy Lewis of Anderson High School (Anderson, Indiana)

All-American Week

Contest winners 
 The 1990 Slam Dunk contest was won by Darrin Hancock.
 The 1990 3-point shoot-out was won by Adrian Autry.

References

External links
McDonald's All-American on the web
McDonald's All-American all-time rosters
McDonald's All-American rosters at Basketball-Reference.com
Game stats at Realgm.com

1989–90 in American basketball
1990
1990 in sports in Indiana
Basketball in Indiana